The Khayaravala dynasty, was a dynasty, that ruled parts of the present-day Indian states of Bihar and Jharkhand, during  the 11th and 12th centuries. Their capital was located at Khayaragarh in Shahabad district. Pratap Dhavala and Shri Pratapa were kings of the dynasty according to inscription of Rohtas. The dynasty ruled the Japila territory(now Japla) as feudatories, of the Gahadavalas.

For most of their history, they were feudatories of the Gahadavala dynasty of Varanasi as detailed by inscriptions which show land grants being made to the Khayaravalas.

History
There are remains of archeological find-spots in the area previously controlled by the dynasty. These find-spots are inscription of Pratapdhavala in Phulwaria, the Tutrahi fall rock inscription of Vikram Samvat 1214, Tarachandi rock inscription of Pratapdhavala of Vikram Samvat 1225, Copper plate inscription of Udayaraja and Indradhavala of Vikram Samvat 1254 and Rohtas inscription of Shri Pratapa of Vikram Samvat 1279.

Ruler
Following are the rulers of Khayaravala dynasty:.
Pratap Dhavala
Udayaraja
Indradhavala
Shri Pratapa

Additional images

References 

Dynasties of India
History of Bihar
Kingdoms of Bihar